Malvoideae is a botanical name at the rank of subfamily, which includes in the minimum the genus Malva. It was first used by Burnett in 1835, but was not much used until recently, where, within the framework of the APG System, which unites the families Malvaceae, Bombacaceae, Sterculiaceae and Tiliaceae of the Cronquist system, the aggregate family Malvaceae is divided into 9 subfamilies, including Malvoideae. The Malvoideae of Kubitzki and Bayer includes 4 tribes:
 Malveae (Abutilon, Alcea, Malva, Sidalcea etc.)
 Gossypieae (Gossypium, the cottons etc.)
 Hibisceae (Hibiscus etc.)
 Kydieae
 - and two unplaced genera:-
 Jumelleanthus
 Howittia

The genus Alyogyne was once included in the genus Hibiscus but is not included there anymore. It is not placed in the Hibisceae either and some resources, such as the GRIN include it in the Gossypieae. The GRIN also excludes Thepparatia from the Gossypieae.

Baum et al. have a wider concept (cladistically, all those plants more closely related to Malva sylvestris than to Bombax ceiba) of Malvoideae, which includes additionally the tribe Matisieae (three genera of Neotropical trees) and the genera Lagunaria, Camptostemon, Pentaplaris and Uladendron.

Genera
 Abelmoschus - Abutilon - Abutilothamnus - Acaulimalva - Akrosida - Alcea - Allosidastrum - Allowissadula - Althaea - Alyogyne - Andeimalva - Anisodontea - Anoda - Anotea - Asterotrichion
 Bakeridesia - Bastardia - Bastardiastrum - Bastardiopsis - Batesimalva - Billieturnera - Briquetia
 Callirhoe - Calyculogygas - Calyptraemalva - Cenocentrum - Cephalohibiscus - Cienfuegosia - Codonochlamys - Corynabutilon - Cristaria
 Decaschistia - Dendrosida - Dicellostyles - Dirhamphis
 Eremalche
 Fioria - Fryxellia - Fuertesimalva
 Gaya - Gossypioides - Gossypium - Gynatrix
 Hampea - Helicteropsis - Herissantia - Hibiscadelphus - Hibiscus - Hochreutinera - Hoheria - Horsfordia - Howittia - Humbertianthus - Humbertiella
 Iliamna
 Julostylis - Jumelleanthus
 Kearnemalvastrum - Kitaibela - Kokia - Kosteletzkya - Krapovickasia - Kydia
 Lagunaria - Lavatera - Lawrencia - Lebronnecia - Lecanophora
 Macrostelia - Malachra - Malacothamnus - Malope - Malva - Malvastrum - Malvaviscus - Malvella - Megistostegium - Meximalva - Modiola - Modiolastrum - Monteiroa
 Napaea - Nayariophyton - Neobaclea - Neobrittonia - Nototriche
 Palaua - Pavonia - Peltaea - Periptera - Perrierophytum - Phragmocarpidium - Phymosia - Plagianthus - Pseudabutilon
 Radyera - Rhynchosida - Robinsonella - Rojasimalva
 Senra - Sida - Sidalcea - Sidasodes - Sidastrum - Sphaeralcea - Spirabutilon - Symphyochlamys
 Talipariti - Tarasa - Tetrasida - Thepparatia - Thespesia
 Urena
 Wercklea - Wissadula

References
 Burnett 1835, Outlines of Botany 816, 1094, 1118 fide James L. Reveal, Index Nominum Supragenicorum Plantarum Vascularium 
 Bayer, C. and K. Kubitzki 2003. Malvaceae, pp. 225–311. In K. Kubitzki (ed.), The Families and Genera of Vascular Plants, vol. 5, Malvales, Capparales and non-betalain Caryophyllales.
  (abstract online here).

External links

 

 
Rosid subfamilies